Steuben Township may refer to the following places in the United States:

Illinois
 Steuben Township, Marshall County, Illinois

Indiana
 Steuben Township, Steuben County, Indiana
 Steuben Township, Warren County, Indiana

Pennsylvania
 Steuben Township, Crawford County, Pennsylvania

See also

Steuben (disambiguation)

Township name disambiguation pages